Marshal of Amarillo is a 1948 American Western film directed by Philip Ford and written by Robert Creighton Williams. The film stars Allan Lane, Eddy Waller, Mildred Coles, Clayton Moore, Roy Barcroft and Trevor Bardette. The film was released on July 15, 1948 by Republic Pictures.

Plot

Cast   
Allan Lane as Marshal Rocky Lane 
Black Jack as Rocky's Horse
Eddy Waller as Nugget Clark
Mildred Coles as Marjorie Underwood
Clayton Moore as Art Crandall
Roy Barcroft as Ben Dolan
Trevor Bardette as Frank Welch
Minerva Urecal as Mrs. Henry Pettigrew
Denver Pyle as The Night Clerk
Charles Williams as Hiram Short
Tom Chatterton as James Underwood
Peter Perkins as Henchman Sam
Tom London as Mr. Snodgrass
Lynn Castile as Matilda Snodgrass

References

External links 
 

1948 films
American Western (genre) films
1948 Western (genre) films
Republic Pictures films
Films directed by Philip Ford
American black-and-white films
1940s English-language films
1940s American films